Music, Musić or Mušič (Cyrillic: Мусиц, Мусић or Мушич) is a Serbo-Croatian and Slovenian language surname and may refer to:

Aleš Mušič (born 1982), Slovenian ice hockey player
Amar Musić (born 1987), Croatian weightlifter
Lorenzo Music (1937–2001), born Gerald David Music, American actor and producer
Marko Mušič (born 1941), Slovenian architect
Michalis Music (born 1999), Cypriot footballer
Vedin Musić (born 1973), Bosnian footballer
Zoran Mušič (1909–2005), Slovenian painter
Carla Lalli Music, American chef and author